Keion Adams (born June 8, 1995) is an American gridiron football defensive lineman for the Winnipeg Blue Bombers of the Canadian Football League (CFL). He played college football at Western Michigan. He was drafted by the Pittsburgh Steelers in the seventh round (248th overall) of the 2017 NFL Draft.

Professional career

Pittsburgh Steelers
The Pittsburgh Steelers selected Adams in the seventh round (248th overall) of the 2017 NFL Draft. Adams was the 24th defensive end drafted in and the 42nd player selected from Western Michigan. With the selection of Adams, Western Michigan had three players selected that year setting a school record for a single draft. The other two players drafted were Corey Davis and Taylor Moton.

On May 10, 2017, the Pittsburgh Steelers signed Adams to a four-year, $2.46 million contract that includes a signing bonus of $66,017.

He was placed on injured reserve on August 29, 2017 after suffering a shoulder injury.

On September 1, 2018, Adams was waived by the Steelers and was signed to the practice squad the next day. He signed a reserve/future contract with the Steelers on January 1, 2019.

Adams was released on May 13, 2019.

New York Giants
On June 4, 2019, Adams signed with the New York Giants. He was waived/injured on August 31, 2019, and reverted to the Giants' injured reserve. He was waived from injured reserve on October 21, 2019.

Saskatchewan Roughriders
Adams signed with the Saskatchewan Roughriders of the CFL on December 29, 2020. Over the 2021 and 2022 seasons, he played in 16 regular season games where he recorded 27 tackles and four sacks. He was transferred to the practice roster on August 25, 2022, before being released on September 26, 2022.

Winnipeg Blue Bombers
On September 28, 2022, it was announced that Adams had signed a practice roster agreement with the Winnipeg Blue Bombers.

References

External links
 Winnipeg Blue Bombers bio
 Pittsburgh Steelers bio
 Western Michigan Broncos bio
 

1995 births
Living people
Players of American football from North Carolina
People from Salisbury, North Carolina
American football defensive ends
American football linebackers
Canadian football defensive linemen
Western Michigan Broncos football players
Pittsburgh Steelers players
New York Giants players
African-American players of American football
Saskatchewan Roughriders players
Winnipeg Blue Bombers players
21st-century African-American sportspeople